Geller is a surname. Depending on one's ancestors' origins, the name may derive from the German word "gellen" (to yell) and mean "one who yells", the Yiddish word "gel" (yellow) and mean the "yellow man", or the Yiddish word "geler", an expression for a redheaded man. It may also be a Russianized respelling of Heller or a variant of the Hungarian first name Gellért. The name appears with some frequency in northwestern Germany, near the city of Aachen.

The following people have the last name Geller:
 Axel Geller (born 1999), Argentine tennis player
 Andrew Geller (1924-2011), Architect
 Bruce Geller (1930–1978), American composer, screenwriter, and television producer
 Efim Geller (1925–1998), Soviet chess player
 E. Scott Geller (born 1942), American behavioral psychologist
 Esther Geller (1921–2015), American painter
 Harold Geller (1916-2005), Australian-born American conductor and composer.
 Herb Geller (1928-2013), Jazz musician and composer
 Jamie Geller (born 1978), American-born Israeli cookbook author and chef
 Jordan Geller (born 1977), American sneaker collector
 Kenneth Geller (born 1947), American lawyer and Managing Partner of the law firm Mayer Brown
 Laurence S. Geller, British real estate investor.
 Margaret Geller (born 1947), American astronomer and astrophysicist
 Max Geller (wrestler) (born 1971), Israeli Olympic wrestler
 Max Geller (artist) (born 1984), American performance artist
 Pamela Geller (born 1958), American blogger, author, political activist, and commentator
 Raul Geller (born 1936), Peruvian-Israeli footballer
 Richard Geller (meditation instructor) (born 1952), president of MedWorks Corporate Meditation Programs
 Richard Geller (physicist) (1927–2007), experimental nuclear and plasma physicist
 Simon Geller (1919-1995), American classical music station radio personality
 Steven Geller (born 1958), American statesman
 Uri Geller (born 1946), Alleged Israeli psychic, magician, and television personality

The following fictional characters also have the last name Geller:
 Monica Geller, a character from the American television sitcom Friends
 Ross Geller, a character from the American television sitcom Friends
 Paris Geller, a character from the American television drama Gilmore Girls

Geller may also refer to:
 Geller House, a modernist house designed by Marcel Breuer

See also:
 Gellar (disambiguation)

Germanic-language surnames
German-language surnames
Russian-language surnames
Jewish surnames